The 1988 Snooker World Cup was a team snooker tournament that took place between 16 and 19 March 1988 at the Bournemouth International Centre in Bournemouth, England. Fersina Windows were the sponsors for the next two years.

Ireland returned to competing as Northern Ireland and Republic of Ireland this year and both went out in the first round to Rest of the World and England respectively. England went on to win their third title with the top 3 world ranked players Steve Davis, Jimmy White and Neal Foulds beating unfancied Australia with Eddie Charlton, John Campbell and Warren King 9 frames to 7.
 


Main draw

Teams

Final

References

World Cup (snooker)
1988 in snooker